The 2008 UNLV Rebels football team represented the University of Nevada, Las Vegas during the 2008 NCAA Division I FBS football season. UNLV competed as a member of the Mountain West Conference (MW) and played their home games at Sam Boyd Stadium in Whitney, Nevada. The Rebels were led by fourth-year head coach Mike Sanford. UNLV finished the season with a 5–7 record (MW: 2–6), narrowly missing bowl eligibility.

UNLV won three of their four out-of-conference games, including overtime upsets of both of their opponents from Bowl Championship Series conferences: 15th-ranked Arizona State of the Pac-10, 23–20, and Iowa State of the Big 12, 34–31. The Rebels led Colorado State in the fourth quarter, 28–27, but the Rams scored with 0:09 left to play and then on the ensuing kickoff recovered a fumble and scored again. UNLV led Air Force in the fourth quarter, 28–20, but lost by one point after the Falcons scored a touchdown and made a field goal. The Rebels were tied at half and the end of the third quarter against 18th-ranked BYU. In the final period, UNLV took a 35–34 lead, but lost after yielding a touchdown with 1:46 remaining to play. Despite losing starting quarterback Omar Clayton to an injury, the Rebels still managed victories over New Mexico and Wyoming. UNLV entered the regular season finale with five wins and needed one more victory to attain bowl eligibility and, with it, very likely a bowl game invitation. The Rebels, however, surrendered 21 points in the fourth quarter against a "woeful" San Diego State team.

Schedule

References

UNLV
UNLV Rebels football seasons
UNLV Rebels football